A home run in baseball refers to a hit in which the batter successfully rounds all the bases on one hit.

Home run may also refer to:

In entertainment and media

In film
Homerun (film), a 2003 Singaporean film
Home Run (film), a 2013 American film

In games
Home Run (video game), a game for the Atari 2600 developed by Bob Whitehead

In music
Homerun (Gotthard album) and its title track, 2001
"Home Run" (song), a 2012 Single by Misha B
Homerun (The Kelly Family album), 2004
Homerun EP, a 2009 EP by The Baseball Project
Homerun (Paulo Londra album), 2019
Home;Run, a song by the K-pop group Seventeen from their 2020 special extended play Semicolon

In television
Colm and Jim-Jim's Home Run, an Irish television gameshow

In geography
Homerun Range, a mountain range in Antarctica

In military
Home Run (call sign) US Navy call sign for the Gearing-class destroyer USS Leary (DDR-879)
Project HOMERUN, a US aerial intelligence operation against USSR in 1956-60
 Camp Home Run, an American Army World War II "Cigarette Camp" located near Le Havre, France and named after a then-popular American cigarette brand

In sports
In American and Canadian football, the term "home run" is used to refer to a touchdown scored from a long distance

In other uses
Home Run Inn, a pizzeria chain in the Chicago, Illinois metropolitan area
In the baseball metaphors for sex, a home run means achieving sexual intercourse on a date